Estonia mainly uses a track gauge of  or , inherited from the Russian Empire times.

Russian gauge

Soviet Union

Post-independence
Since post-independence all renovated tracks owned by Eesti Raudtee have gauge . Other tracks have gauge 1,520 mm.

Standard gauge proposals 

There has been a proposal from the EU to build a standard gauge railway from Tallinn to Warsaw, the Rail Baltica.

Narrow gauge

Historically Estonia had  narrow-gauge installations.

References

Estonia
Rail infrastructure in Estonia